Gina Ann Casandra Swainson (born 6 June 1958) is a Bermudian model and beauty queen who won Miss World 1979 and the first runner-up at Miss Universe 1979.

Miss Universe
Prior to competing in Miss World, she participated in Miss Universe and placed first runner-up to Miss Universe 1979, Maritza Sayalero of Venezuela.

Miss World
As the official representative of Bermuda to the 1979 Miss World pageant held in London, United Kingdom on 15 November, she captured the crown of Miss World 1979, becoming the only woman to win a major international pageant for Bermuda as of 2020 and the most successful at both Miss Universe and Miss World.

Upon her return to Bermuda, there was a parade in her honour and Swainson was depicted on a series of Bermudian postage stamps in 1980.

References

External links
 Bernews: Gina Swainson Bio, Photo Gallery, Videos

1958 births
Bermudian beauty pageant winners
Bermudian female models
Living people
Miss Universe 1979 contestants
Miss World 1979 delegates
Miss World winners